Yury Konovalov (born 23 September 1961) is a Russian sailor. He competed at the 1988 Summer Olympics, the 1992 Summer Olympics, and the 1996 Summer Olympics.

References

External links
 

1961 births
Living people
Russian male sailors (sport)
Soviet male sailors (sport)
Olympic sailors of the Soviet Union
Olympic sailors of the Unified Team
Olympic sailors of Russia
Sailors at the 1988 Summer Olympics – Tornado
Sailors at the 1992 Summer Olympics – Tornado
Sailors at the 1996 Summer Olympics – Tornado
Place of birth missing (living people)